The Supreme Impulse is a 1915 American silent short film comedy-drama film directed by Lucius Henderson. Starring William Garwood in the lead role with Violet Mersereau.

Cast
 William Garwood as Earl Graham
 Violet Mersereau as Ann Donnelson

References

External links

1915 films
1915 comedy-drama films
1910s English-language films
American silent short films
American black-and-white films
1910s American films
Silent American comedy-drama films
Comedy-drama short films